John D'Or Prairie 215 (Jean D’Or in French) is an Indian reserve of the Little Red River Cree Nation in northern Alberta, Canada.

External links 
 Map of John D'Or Prairie 215 at Statcan

References 

Indian reserves in Alberta
Cree reserves and territories